John Byron Dale (born December 19, 1945) is an American former ice hockey defenseman and Olympian.

Dale played with Team USA at the 1968 Winter Olympics held in Grenoble, France. He previously played for the Eastern Hockey League's Johnstown Jets as well as the University of Minnesota Golden Gophers men's ice hockey team.

Jack Dale is the father of actor Ian Anthony Dale (born July 3, 1978).

References

External links

1945 births
Living people
Ice hockey players at the 1968 Winter Olympics
Olympic ice hockey players of the United States
American men's ice hockey left wingers